Blaine Allen Earon (January 15, 1929 – June 3, 2019) was a professional American football defensive lineman in the National Football League (NFL). After playing college football at Duke University, Earon was drafted by the Detroit Lions in the 19th round (226th overall) of the 1952 NFL Draft. He played for the Detroit Lions in 1952 and 1953, both championship winning seasons.

References

1929 births
2019 deaths
American football defensive linemen
Detroit Lions players
Duke Blue Devils football players
Sportspeople from Altoona, Pennsylvania
Players of American football from Pennsylvania